Upper East may refer to:

 Upper East Side, Manhattan, New York City
 Upper East Region, Ghana
 Upper Eastside, Miami, United States